Carmen Schäfer may refer to:
Carmen Schäfer (curler) (born 1981), Swiss curler
Carmen Schäfer (footballer) (born 1971), German footballer